Anita Agatha Kurmann (November 22, 1976 – August 7, 2015) was a Swiss endocrinologist and thyroid surgeon.

Life
Anita studied medicine in Basel and worked at the Inselspital in Bern, then moved to Boston to train in research at the Beth Israel Deaconess hospital, where she was a post-doctoral fellow. She worked with a multi-institution group based at Boston University that was the first to generate thyroid cell progenitors and thyroid follicular organoids from pluripotent stem cells (PSCs) in mice, and thyroid cell progenitors from induced PSCs in humans.  This was achieved by establishing the signalling required to create a thyroid lineage, namely BMP4 and FGF2.  It was shown that thyroid hormones were secreted by the mice organoids after transplantation into mice.

Death
Kurmann was planning to return to Switzerland to become head of endocrine surgery at the Inselspital, but was killed in a bicycle crash in Boston. As she was riding south on Mass Ave, a flatbed tractor trailer turned right onto Beacon Street in front of her and Anita was run over by the trailer's wheels. The group's paper of which she was co-lead author was dedicated to her memory.

In the police report, Boston police state the truck driver had his right turn signal active for eight seconds prior to the turn, and that Kurmann was riding in a bus lane when she was struck. Bicycle advocates maintain she had the right to use that lane. 

Police investigators concluded that Kurmann failed to recognize the truck was turning and was riding in the truck's blind spot. All large trucks have 4 documented blind spots, the largest of which is on the right side of the vehicle. Though trucks in many European countries have begun to utilize or require a 6 mirror system to eliminate the driver's inability to see in these blindspots and/or advanced collision sensors with automatic braking, no such equipment is required for large trucks driving on America's urban roads.

Following this crash, the intersection of Beacon Street where it occurred was equipped with advanced stop lines.

References

Swiss endocrinologists
Women endocrinologists
Swiss surgeons
1976 births
2015 deaths
Swiss women scientists
Place of birth missing
People from Boston
Cycling road incident deaths
Road incident deaths in Massachusetts
20th-century Swiss physicians
21st-century Swiss physicians
20th-century Swiss scientists
20th-century women scientists
21st-century women scientists
Women surgeons
20th-century surgeons